Solanum verrogeneum is a species of plant in the family Solanaceae. Its common name is berenjena. It can be found in Costa Rica's rainforest. It is only found in places where light is more abundant.

Fruit

When ripe the fruit is soft and the skin is bright orange. The flesh appears glazed, slightly translucent and the flesh becomes juicy. The unripe fruit is green and hard. Its flesh is a white to tan color and is solidified.

Edibility

When picking this fruit proceed with caution. Small needle like trichomes from the fruit can break off into skin, causing minor agitation. Before eating the fruit, first dip it in water then rub the skin against something hard and slightly abrasive (like a rock). This will remove the trichomes.

The fruit is edible. The roots are used as medicine.

Trichomes and spines
The dermal tissue system of Solanum verrogeneum has interesting and distinguishable qualities. The apical and axillary buds along with the young leaves and flowers of the plant have large trichomes at higher densities than the rest of the shoot system. Spines are scattered around the stem and are easily noticed. Spines are present on the mature leaves as well but standout less. Covered on both sides of the leaf, these spines run perpendicular to and trail adjacently along the main veins. The spines follow or "trail" each other in a linear fashion, extending from the tip of the blade down to the petiole. Because of their inconspicuous location and unique arrangement, these spines have a tendency to be overlooked, especially by newcomers.

References

verrogeneum
Flora of Costa Rica